On July 11, 2016, Larry Darnell Gordon, an inmate, opened fire on the third floor of the Berrien County Courthouse in St. Joseph, Michigan, killing two bailiffs and injuring a sheriff's deputy. Gordon, who was facing a multitude of charges that carried a possible life sentence, was being taken to a holding cell following a courthouse hearing when he disarmed an officer and attempted to take hostages. Moments after taking hostages, other court officers shot and killed Gordon.

Details
Prior to the shooting, Gordon was handcuffed and escorted by a deputy sheriff from the Berrien County Courthouse to a holding cell following the conclusion of a hearing. He was facing a multitude of charges. According to the county sheriff, Gordon had been handcuffed in front rather than behind his back, and the restraint was not linked to a belly chain that would further restrict movement.

In an escape attempt, Gordon attacked a deputy sheriff on the third floor of the courthouse, in an area not accessible to the public. He managed to disarm and shoot the deputy (Atterberry) and two bailiffs (Kienzle and Zangaro) responding to the noise of the struggle.  He then escaped into a public hallway, where he briefly took hostages when cornered by four other responding bailiffs (Ken Field, Milt Russell, Tom Schultz and Rick Lull).  As Gordon moved toward an unsecured stairway he pointed the weapon in the direction of the bailiffs who then shot and killed him.  In the course of stopping Gordon, a civilian (Kenya Ellis) was shot, receiving non-life-threatening wounds to her arm.

Victims
Gordon killed two bailiffs. He also injured sheriff's deputy James Atterbury Jr..  The injured were hospitalized at Lakeland Medical Center and listed in stable condition. Both slain bailiffs were retired police officers.

The bailiffs killed were identified as:
 Joseph Zangaro, 61, the courthouse security director who had been with the department since 2004.
 Ron Kienzle, 63, an Army veteran who had been with the department since 2005.

Perpetrator
Larry Darnell Gordon ( 1972 – July 11, 2016) was a resident of Coloma, Michigan. In April, he was charged with six counts of first-degree criminal sexual conduct; three counts of sexual child abuse; two counts each of assault with a dangerous weapon, assault by strangulation, and resisting or obstructing police; and one count each of drug possession, kidnapping, and unlawful imprisonment. According to police, these charges were filed after it was discovered that Gordon had entered into a year-long sexual relationship with a 16-year-old girl in October 2015, started making sex videos of her, and locked her in a shed on one occasion. He faced a possible life sentence for the charges.

According to the girl, Gordon would forcibly give her methamphetamine in exchange for sex, occasionally rape her, strangle her, and assault her with a variety of weapons, all the while recording the acts. She also alleged that Gordon held her captive inside the shed for approximately two months. Police were now investigating his possible connection to a similar crime in 2006.

In addition to the aforementioned charges, Gordon faced two other charges of aggravated domestic assault and assault with a dangerous weapon, in relation to an incident involving his ex-wife. On April 20, following a police welfare check on the couple's home in January, Gordon was arrested on an outstanding warrant filed in relation to those charges. During the arrest, he barricaded himself inside the house and later escaped through a backdoor. He was found hiding under a porch several streets away by a police dog. Later, police discovered the teenage girl inside a shed on Gordon's property, along with drugs, related paraphernalia, weapons, and other items. On the day of the shooting, Gordon was scheduled to be in court to have the warrant dismissed due to the charges involving the teenage girl.

Previously, in 1992, Gordon was sentenced to 70 months in federal prison for possessing pipe bombs. In 1998, he was sentenced to more than four years in state prison for eluding police officers. In 2001, he served 51 months in federal prison for firearms charges. In 2013, Gordon was put on probation for stealing fireworks from a temporary stand.

Aftermath
The Berrien County Courthouse closed on July 12 and increased its security as a result of the shooting. A makeshift memorial was set up near the Berrien County Sheriff's Department. The Berrien County Sheriff's Department pledged to review its guidelines for transporting suspects of violent crimes, while judges across Michigan were asked to review the security plans of courthouses.

Funeral proceedings for Zangaro and Kienzle were scheduled for July 15 and July 18, respectively.

Reactions
Governor Rick Snyder traveled to the courthouse the evening of July 11 for a press conference, during which he stated, "This is a particularly tough time for law enforcement. This is a terrible event to have happen, and we need to rally together."

U.S. Representative Fred Upton, who is a St. Joseph native, released a statement saying, "What occurred today in my hometown breaks my heart. My thoughts are with our entire community — our friends and neighbors. One thing is clear: we must do better to prevent these types of tragedies from occurring."

See also

 List of homicides in Michigan
 Brian Nichols
 Tyler courthouse shooting
 Gun violence in the United States
 List of American police officers killed in the line of duty
 List of killings by law enforcement officers in the United States

References

Attacks in the United States in 2016
2016 mass shootings in the United States
Mass shootings in the United States
2016 murders in the United States
2016 in Michigan
Deaths by firearm in Michigan
July 2016 crimes in the United States
St. Joseph, Michigan
Mass shootings in Michigan